Xeniaria is a genus of earwigs in the family Arixeniidae.

Species
The genus includes the following three species:

 Xeniaria bicornis
 Xeniaria jacobsoni
 Xeniaria truncata

References

Dermaptera genera
Arixeniina